Jerome Martin Jenkins (born July 2, 1967) is a former head men's basketball coach at California State University, Sacramento. His contract was not renewed following the 2007–2008 season. Jenkins played collegiately for Lonnie Porter at Regis University.

Head coaching record

College

Junior college

References

External links
Santa Monica CC bio (2011)
Sacramento State bio (2007)

1967 births
Living people
American men's basketball coaches
Basketball coaches from California
Basketball players from Los Angeles
Eastern Washington Eagles men's basketball coaches
Los Angeles City Cubs men's basketball players
Sacramento State Hornets men's basketball coaches
Santa Monica Corsairs men's basketball coaches
American men's basketball players
Point guards